Remittances to Bangladesh are money transfers (remittances) sent by the Bangladeshi diaspora to Bangladesh. According to the World Bank, Bangladesh is the 7th highest recipient of remittance in the world with almost $22.1 billion in 2021 and was the third highest recipient of remittance in South Asia. A survey on the remittance usage conducted by the Bangladesh Bureau of Statistics in 2013 showed that 32.81% and 32.82% of the remittances are used for food and non-food expenditures. 18.84% of remittances were used for durable and other expenses including 17.39% utilised for the purchase of land. In regards to investment and savings, the Bangladesh Bureau of Statistics revealed that 33.45% of remittances goes to investment and 13.74% of remittances goes to savings.

History
In 1974, Wage Earners' Scheme was initiated in order to help the Non-resident Bangladeshis remit their earnings home through legal channels. The scheme soon became popular among the Bangladeshi community working abroad. Around $11.8 million was remitted to Bangladesh in the fiscal year of 1974–75. The amount rose to over $350 million in the fiscal year of 1980-81 and to over $750 million in the fiscal year of 1990–91. Saudi Arabia has been the largest source of foreign remittance to Bangladesh or send money to Bangladesh. UAE, Qatar, Oman, Bahrain, Kuwait, Libya, Iraq, Singapore, Malaysia, the US and the UK are also major sources of foreign remittance.

The Bangladesh Bank annually names top 10 diaspora Bangladeshis who have made the highest remittances and in recognition of their contribution to the economy through remittance. One of these has been Mahtabur Rahman chairman of Al Haramain Hospital and managing director of Al Haramain Perfumes who has been listed in 2013, 2014 and 2015.

Remittances to Bangladesh by fiscal year and country

Remittances to Bangladesh by fiscal year

Remittance sending system

Formal system 
Remittance is sent formally through various ways such as demand draft, traveler's check, telegraphic transfer, postal order, direct transfer, Automatic Teller Machine. etc.

System 
Hundi or money carrier system is prevalent as informal process of remittance sending in most cases. The most popular reasons behind the preference towards Hundi system is the absence of any transaction charges, its fast delivery and the opportunity to maintain confidentiality.

References

Economy of Bangladesh
Remittances
Bangladeshi diaspora
Finance in Bangladesh